Baiyun Park Station, formerly called Baiyun New Town Station during planning, is a metro station of Guangzhou Metro Line 2. It is located at the underground of Qile Road at the centre area of the former Baiyun International Airport, in the Baiyun District of Guangzhou. It started its operation on 25 September 2010.

References

Railway stations in China opened in 2010
Guangzhou Metro stations in Baiyun District